Kinanda is the second studio album by Norwegian-Kenyan singer Stella Mwangi, released on June 10, 2011, in Norway. It peaked to number 15 on the Norwegian Albums Chart.

Singles
"Smile" was released as the first single in 2010.
"Haba Haba" was released as the second single on February 28, 2011. Stella Mwangi performed the song in the Eurovision Song Contest 2011 representing Norway in the contest and in the Semi-final held in Düsseldorf, Germany scored 30 points and finished 17th, Failing to qualify for the final. It reached number 1 on the Norwegian Singles Chart.
"Lookie Lookie" was released as the third single on May 27, 2011.
"Take My Time" was released as the fourth single on June 24, 2011.
"Hula Hoop" was released as the fifth single on November 11, 2011.

Track listing

Chart performance

Release history

References

External links 
Official website

2011 albums